The Schamel equation (S-equation) is a nonlinear partial differential equation of first order in time and third order in space. Similar to a Korteweg de Vries equation (KdV), it describes the development of a localized, coherent wave structure that propagates in a nonlinear dispersive medium. It was first derived in 1973 by Hans Schamel  to describe the effects of electron trapping  in the trough of the potential of a solitary electrostatic wave structure travelling with ion acoustic speed in a two-component plasma. It now applies to various localized pulse dynamics such as:
 electron and ion holes or phase space vortices in collision-free plasmas such as space plasmas, 
 axisymmetric pulse propagation in physically stiffened nonlinear cylindrical shells,
 "Soliton" propagation in nonlinear transmission lines  or in fiber optics and laser physics.

The equation
The Schamel equation is 

 

In the case of ion-acoustic solitary waves, the parameter  reflects the effect of electrons trapped in the trough of the electrostatic potential .
It holds , where  is the wave amplitude. All quantities are normalized: the potential energy by electron thermal energy, the velocity by ion sound speed, time by inverse ion plasma frequency and space by electron Debye length. Note that for a KdV equation   is replaced by  such that the nonlinearity becomes bilinear (see later).

Solitary wave solution
The steady state solitary wave solution, is given in the comoving frame by:

 

 

The speed of the structure  is supersonic, since  has to be positive, which corresponds in the ion acoustic case to a depressed trapped electron distribution .

Proof by pseudo-potential method
From this we get by an integration: , which represents the pseudo-energy, and from the Schamel equation:
. Through the obvious demand, namely that at potential maximum, the slope  of  vanishes we get: . This is a nonlinear dispersion relation (NDR) because it determines the phase velocity  given by the second expression. It becomes:

 

 

Note that the integral in the denominator of  exists and can be expressed by known mathematical functions. Hence  is a mathematically disclosed function. However, the structure often remains mathematically undisclosed, i.e.  it cannot be expressed by known functions (see for instance Sect. Logarithmic Schamel equation). This generally happens if more than one trapping scenarios are involved, as e.g. in driven intermittent plasma turbulence.

Non-integrability
In contrast to the KdV equation, the Schamel equation is an example of a non-integrable evolution equation. It only has a finite number of (polynomial) constants of motion  and does not pass a Painlevé test. Since a so-called Lax pair (L,P) does not exist, it is not integrable  by the inverse scattering transform.

Generalizations

Schamel–Korteweg de Vries equation 
Taking into account the next order in the expression for the expanded electron density, we get
, from which we obtain the pseudo-potential -. The corresponding evolution equation then becomes:

 

which is the Schamel–Korteweg de Vries equation.

Its solitary wave solution reads 

 

Depending on Q it has two limiting solitary wave solutions: For   we find , the Schamel solitary wave.

For  we get  which represents the ordinary ion acoustic soliton. Note that the absence of a trapping effect (b = 0) does not imply the absence of trapping, a statement that is usually misrepresented in the literature, especially in textbooks.

Logarithmic Schamel equation
Another generalization of the S-equation is obtained in the case of ion acoustic waves by admitting a second trapping channel. By considering an additional, non-perturbative trapping scenario, Schamel  received:

,

a generalization called logarithmic S-equation. From this follows  which is the inverse function of the Gaussian mentioned. For a non-zero b, keeping , the integral to get  can no longer be solved analytically, i.e. by known mathematical functions. A solitary wave structure still exists, but cannot be reached in a disclosed form.

Schamel equation with random coefficients
The fact that electrostatic trapping involves stochastic processes at resonance caused by chaotic particle trajectories has led to considering b in the S-equation as a stochastic quantity. This results in a Wick-type stochastic S-equation.

Time-fractional Schamel equation
A further generalization is obtained by replacing the first time derivative  by a Riesz fractional derivative yielding a time-fractional S-equation. It has applications e.g. for the broadband electrostatic noise observed by the Viking satellite.

Schamel–Schrödinger equation
A connection between the Schamel equation and the nonlinear Schrödinger equation can be made  within the context of  a Madelung fluid. It results in the Schamel-Schrödinger equation.

 

and has applications in fiber optics  and laser physics.

Weblinks
 www.hans-schamel.de : further information by Hans Schamel

References

Partial differential equations
Plasma physics
Ionosphere
Space plasmas
Waves in plasmas